Aboubakar Keita (born 5 November 1997) is an Ivorian footballer who plays as a midfielder for Swedish club AIK.

Club career

F.C. Copenhagen
After having visited F.C. Copenhagen on multiple occasions, Keita signed a contract with the club shortly after his 18th birthday in November 2015, playing the remainder of the autumn with the under-19 team. On 11 January 2016 Keita was promoted to the first team squad.

On 13 March 2016, Keita debuted for the first team, when he substituted William Kvist in the Danish Superliga match against AaB. Three days later, he was in the starting eleven in the Danish Cup game against Randers FC.

Keita signed a loan deal with Norwegian club Stabæk to June 2019.

AIK
On 1 February 2023, Keita signed with Swedish club AIK until the end of 2024.

International career
He debuted for the Ivory Coast U23s in a 5–1 loss to France U21, scoring the only goal for his team in the game.

Honours

Club
Copenhagen
 Danish Superliga: 2015–16
 Danish Cup: 2015–16

Ivory Coast U23
Africa U-23 Cup of Nations runner-up:2019

References

External links
 Aboubakar Keita at Football-Lineups
 

1997 births
Living people
Ivorian footballers
F.C. Copenhagen players
Stabæk Fotball players
Halmstads BK players
Oud-Heverlee Leuven players
R. Charleroi S.C. players
RWDM47 players
Sektzia Ness Ziona F.C. players
AIK Fotboll players
Danish Superliga players
Allsvenskan players
Eliteserien players
Belgian Pro League players
Challenger Pro League players
Israeli Premier League players
Footballers from Abidjan
Ivorian expatriate footballers
Expatriate footballers in Belgium
Expatriate men's footballers in Denmark
Expatriate footballers in Sweden
Expatriate footballers in Norway
Expatriate footballers in Israel
Ivorian expatriate sportspeople in Belgium
Ivorian expatriate sportspeople in Denmark
Ivorian expatriate sportspeople in Sweden
Ivorian expatriate sportspeople in Norway
Ivorian expatriate sportspeople in Israel
Ivory Coast under-20 international footballers
Ivory Coast youth international footballers
Association football midfielders